VTap is a video search engine launched on 10 September 2007 and designed for broadband-enabled phones and developed by venture capitalist firm Veveo; a funded startup headquartered in Andover, Massachusetts. The company claims Vtap has a huge index of web videos comparable to the biggest video portals, providing a search-and-browse system that enables finding videos from a huge network database even using devices such as phones and televisions. Videos can be played on a number of phones including iPhones, Windows mobile phones, several Nokia phones. and the BlackBerry wireless device.
 Veveo's network servers convert the original format on-the-fly into a format that can stream and play on the specific phone in question.

VTap's basic search technology is not specific to videos. The service also provides a phone-enhanced Wikipedia search service. The same technology can also be used to enhance remote-control based TV Listings and VOD search offered by IPTV and cable television operators.

References

External links
Business Week magazine article

Software companies of the United States
Domain-specific search engines
Companies based in Massachusetts
BlackBerry software